Cristy FerMinute (previously Cristy Per Minute) was a weekday afternoon television entertainment news and talk show, and is now a showbiz-oriented commentary live radio talk show in the Philippines. It was premiered on ABS-CBN as Cristy Per Minute which started from January 30, 1995, to January 7, 2000. CPM aired Monday to Friday 1:30 pm after 'Sang Linggo nAPO Sila which was later replaced by Magandang Tanghali Bayan from 1995 to 1999 and later its moved to 3:00 pm before Hoy! Gising! until the show ended; on November 8, 2010, its name was changed to Cristy FerMinute, which is currently airing via One PH on free-to-air digital and cable television and simulcast on the flagship radio station of TV5 Network, 92.3 Radyo5 True FM. Both shows are hosted by Cristy Fermin.

Cristy Per Minute on ABS-CBN
Cristy Fermin back then was one of the hosts of the top-rating Sunday showbiz show Showbiz Lingo. When ABS-CBN executives saw her expertise in exploiting the latest showbiz news, they decided to put up a show that the masses would also look forward to aside from Showbiz Lingo. Cristy Per Minute was conceptualized by ABS-CBN and aired its first episode on January 30, 1995. In here, Cristy can interview famous showbiz personalities about their latest events, dish out her own opinions and even letting the viewers have their own view about the intrigues and headlines. Every Friday, the show also had its Grand Fans Day, wherein, several celebrities are guested in the event.

The show was also hosted by Ogie Diaz and John Lapus, where they worked with Fermin also in the top-rated Sunday talk show Showbiz Lingo. Their job on the show is to guide the viewers about the latest topics through voting and texting, wherein they have to answer a poll question and through their own segments. The question is about the celebrity that guested on the show. Along with Diaz and Lapus, Gia Garchitorena was also joined in as co-host of the show, all 3 were hired by then-Supervising producer Deo Endrinal.

Cristy Per Minute made a tremendous run for quite some time that it had beaten the rival network's showbiz-oriented shows. However, in 1999, the show had to move on its new timeslot and on January 7, 2000, the show aired its final episode after a successful 5-year run on the network.

Cristy FerMinute on Radyo5/One PH
Fermin, who is now working for TV5, is currently hosting a showbiz-oriented commentary radio show on 92.3 Radyo5 True FM, where the show is called Cristy FerMinute. Debuting on FM radio on November 8, 2010, name seemed to be synonymous to the show she had on ABS-CBN for 4 years, but her name was there, only added the "-ute" after her surname. She is joined by Richard Pinlac as her co-host during the first 4 years, until Pinlac was replaced by Ronnie Carasco and Wendell Alvarez (Fermin's substitute host while Carasco is not on air). Elmer Reyes and Arniel Serato later joined the show, a few months after the program's pilot episode. Romel Chika is currently her co-host. The radio show dishes out the latest showbiz news that are currently happening in the country and in abroad.

Currently, the show is produced by Cignal TV. It is simulcast on television via AksyonTV from 2011 to 2019 and One PH from 2019 to 2020 and since 2021. It also streams online on Facebook and YouTube via One PH.

Hosts

Main Host
Cristy Fermin

Co-hosts
Ogie Diaz (1995–1999; segment host, Cristy Per Minute on ABS-CBN)
John Lapus (1995–1999; segment host, Cristy Per Minute on ABS-CBN)
Gia Garchitorena  (1995–1999; segment host, Cristy Per Minute on ABS-CBN)
Richard Pinlac (1995–1999; segment host, Cristy Per Minute on ABS-CBN; 2010–2015; Cristy Ferminute on 92.3 NewsFM)
MJ Felipe (1995–1999; segment host, Cristy Per Minute on ABS-CBN)
Elmer Reyes (2011–2015; Cristy Ferminute on 92.3 NewsFM)
Arniel Serato (2011–2015; Cristy Ferminute on 92.3 NewsFM)
Ronnie Carasco (2015–2017; Cristy Ferminute on 92.3 NewsFM)
Wendell Alvarez (2017–2019; Cristy Ferminute on 92.3 NewsFM, substitute host for Ronnie Carasco)
Romel Chika (2019–present; Cristy Ferminute on 92.3 NewsFM)

See also
List of programs broadcast by ABS-CBN
List of programs aired by AksyonTV/5 Plus

References 

ABS-CBN original programming
AksyonTV original programming
One PH original programming
News5 shows
Entertainment news shows in the Philippines
1995 Philippine television series debuts
2000 Philippine television series endings
1990s Philippine television series
Philippine radio programs
2010 radio programme debuts
Filipino-language television shows